Christine is a horror novel by American writer Stephen King, published in 1983. It tells the story of a car (a 1958 Plymouth Fury) apparently possessed by malevolent supernatural forces. A film adaptation, directed by John Carpenter, was released eight months later in December of the same year. In April 2013, PS Publishing released Christine in a limited 30th Anniversary Edition.

Synopsis
In 1978,  bespectacled, acne-ridden, nerdy teen Arnold and his pal Dennis notice a dilapidated 1958 Plymouth Fury being sold by Roland D. LeBay, an elderly gentleman with a back supporter and a grouchy manner. Despite Dennis's reservations, Arnie buys Christine, as LeBay named the vehicle, for $250. While Arnie finishes the paperwork, Dennis sits inside Christine and has a vision of the car and the surroundings as they existed when the car was new, 20 years earlier. Frightened, Dennis decides he dislikes Christine. Arnie brings Christine to a do-it-yourself garage run by Will Darnell, who is suspected of using the garage as a front for illicit operations. As Arnie restores the car, he stops wearing his glasses and his blemishes disappear, but he also becomes withdrawn, humorless, and cynical. When LeBay dies, Dennis meets his younger brother, George, who reveals LeBay's history of anger and violent behavior. George reveals that LeBay's young daughter choked to death on a hamburger in the back seat of the car and that LeBay's wife subsequently committed suicide in its front seat by carbon monoxide poisoning.

Dennis observes that Arnie is taking on many of LeBay's personality traits and has begun dressing like a 1950s greaser. Dennis also sees that Arnie has become close to Darnell, even acting as a courier in Darnell's smuggling operations. When Arnie is almost finished restoring Christine, he begins dating an attractive student named Leigh. Arnie's parents force him to keep Christine in an airport parking lot. Soon afterward, Clarence "Buddy" Repperton, a bully who blames Arnie for his expulsion from school, learns where Christine is being kept and vandalizes the car with help from his gang. Arnie, aware of Christine's ability to repair herself, pushes her through Darnell's garage until enough of the damage is undone for her to run, and then drives her through the junkyard until she is fully restored. Arnie strains his back in the process and begins wearing a back brace, as LeBay did. During a date with Arnie, Leigh nearly chokes to death on a hamburger and is saved only by the intervention of a hitchhiker. Leigh notices that Christine's dashboard lights seemed to become glaring green eyes, watching her during the incident, and that Arnie only half-heartedly tried to save her. Believing she and Christine are competing for Arnie's affection, Leigh vows to never get into the car again. Several inexplicable car-related deaths occur around town. The victims include Darnell, Buddy and all but one of his accomplices in the vandalism. The police link Christine to each of the murders, but no evidence is found on the car. Detective Rudy Junkins becomes suspicious of Arnie despite his airtight alibis. Christine, possessed by LeBay's vengeful spirit, is committing these murders independently and then repairing herself.

Leigh and Dennis begin a relationship while unearthing details of Christine and LeBay's past. Dennis speculates that LeBay sacrificed his daughter and wife to make Christine a receptacle for his spirit. They compare Arnie's signatures from before and after his purchase of Christine with LeBay's. Arnie stumbles upon Leigh and Dennis being intimately close in Dennis' car, sending him into a rage. Soon after, Junkins is killed in a car crash. Suspecting they are next, Dennis and Leigh devise a plan to destroy the car and save Arnie. While Arnie is visiting a college, Dennis and Leigh lure Christine to the garage and batter her to pieces using a septic tanker truck. Dennis witnesses LeBay's spirit attempting to make him stop before the wreckage is crushed. Dennis learns that Arnie and his mother were both killed in a highway accident, while Christine earlier killed Arnie's father. Witness accounts lead Dennis to believe that LeBay's spirit, tied to Arnie through Christine, fled the Plymouth and attempted to repossess Arnie, but Arnie fought him to a draw, resulting in the wreck.

Four years later, Dennis and Leigh have ended their relationship. He reads about a car accident in Los Angeles, in which a drive-in theater employee—the last surviving member of Buddy's gang—was killed by a car that smashed through a cinderblock wall. Dennis speculates that Christine may have rebuilt herself and is setting out to kill everyone who stood against her, saving him for last.

Reception
Christine has received the Locus Award Nominee for Best Fantasy Novel (1984).

The American Library Association named Christine the 95th most banned and challenged book in the United States between 1990 and 1999.

See also

 "Killdozer!", 1944 science fiction novella written by Theodore Sturgeon
 "Sally", a 1953 short story by Isaac Asimov
 "You Drive", a 1964 episode of the original The Twilight Zone series
 "Trucks", a 1973 short story by Stephen King, featuring homicidal sentient trucks
 The Car, a 1977 horror film about a killer car
 The Twilight Zone: Season 2, Episode 15 "Joy Ride", aired 21 May 1987
 Star Trek: Voyager: Season 6, Episode 5 "Alice (Star Trek: Voyager)", aired 20 October 1999 
 Futurama: Season 2, Episode 18 "The Honking" (2000)
 From a Buick 8 (2002), another novel by Stephen King about a mysterious car
 Black Cadillac, a 2003 film about a car that stalks its victims relentlessly
 "Route 666", a 2006 episode of Supernatural about a possessed truck

References

External links
 
 Christine at theofficialjohncarpenter.com

1983 American novels
1980s horror novels
Cengage books
Fictional cars
American horror novels
American novels adapted into films
Novels by Stephen King
Novels set in Pennsylvania
Viking Press books
Novels about bullying
Fiction set in 1978
Phantom vehicles
Fiction about curses